Beishi River Historical Trail is a trail in Pinglin District and Shuangxi District in New Taipei, Taiwan.

Geology
The trail follows the paths along Beishi River for a distance of 2.6 km. It has two entrances, one located near Heilongtan Campground in Pinglin District and the other located at Liaojiaokeng Community in Shuangxi District.

Architecture
There is an earth god shrine located at the beginning of the trail.

Transportation
The trail is accessible by bus from Shuangxi Station.

See also
Pingxi Historical Trail
Shakadang Trail

References

Hiking trails in Taiwan
Tourist attractions in New Taipei